Jehan Daruvala (born 1 October 1998) is an Indian racing driver currently driving for MP Motorsport in Formula 2 and acting as reserve driver for the Mahindra Racing Formula E team. He was a protégé of the Force India F1 team, after being one of three winners of a 'One in a Billion hunt' organized by the team in 2011. He is also a former member of the Red Bull Junior Team.

Early life 

Daruvala was born in Mumbai to Khurshed and Kainaz Daruvala, a Parsi family. He studied at Bombay Scottish School, Mahim. His father Khurshed is the current MD of Sterling & Wilson, an associate company of Shapoorji Pallonji.

Career

Karting 
Daruvala started karting at the age of thirteen in 2011, participating in many events across his karting career. He won the 2012 Asia-Pacific Championship and 2013 Super 1 National Championship titles as champion and many other series as vice champion across Asia and Europe. Daruvala placed third in the 2014 Karting World Championship. He was coached by Rayomand Banajee who recognised his talent early on and was instrumental in laying the foundations for his future success.

Eurocup Formula Renault 2.0

2015 

In 2015, Daruvala stepped up to single-seaters with Fortec Motorsport in the Formula Renault 2.0 championships. Three podiums, including consistent points scoring helped him rank fifth in the Northern European Cup. He partook as a guest driver in the Eurocup and Alps series.

2016 

The following year, Daruvala switched to reigning series champions Josef Kaufmann Racing partnering Lando Norris and Robert Shwartzman. He took an opening pole position at Monza, and in the second race, he took a podium. In Hungary, he took his first Northern European Cup win. Three more third places saw Daruvala rank fourth in the North European Cup. In the Eurocup, Daruvala took an opening podium but was unable to replicate the result again. He eventually finished ninth in the Eurocup standings.

Toyota Racing Series 
Before the start of Daruvala's 2016 season, he took part in the Toyota Racing Series. Three wins and three more podiums helped Daruvala become vice-champion to Lando Norris.

Daruvala returned to the Toyota Racing Series for the 2017 season. He claimed the most pole positions of any driver and claimed two wins, one of which was the New Zealand Grand Prix. Despite that, he only ranked fifth in the championship, as the championship fight was more competitive.

European Formula 3 Championship

2017 

In November 2016, Daruvala stated his intention to switch to the European Formula 3 Championship for the 2017 season. He signed to race with Carlin the following month. At the first Monza race, Daruvala took his first pole position in the series and would convert it into a second place, having led the majority of the race. He scored another podium at the Hungaroring before finally taking his maiden win at the Norisring, passing polesitter Maximilian Günther on the first lap from second. Daruvala finished sixth in the championship. He also participated in the 2017 Macau Grand Prix, finishing tenth in the race after starting 16th.

2018 
Daruvala remained with Carlin for the 2018 season. He achieved a third place in the opening weekend at Pau, during the third race. Daruvala scored his only win of the year in the first race of the Spa-Francorchamps round, taking pole position and the fastest lap. Overall, he claimed a total of five podiums, including one win and a pole position. Despite that, Daruvala only ranked tenth in the standings, due to his inconsistent points scoring. Daruvala once again participated in the 2018 Macau Grand Prix. He finished two places lower than the previous year in 12th, having started 17th.

GP3 Series 
Daruvala joined MP Motorsport in the Yas Marina GP3 finale, taking Niko Kari's seat. He finished both races in 19th and 13th.

FIA Formula 3 Championship 

In 2019, Daruvala competed in the inaugural Formula 3 season for the Prema Powerteam, alongside Robert Shwartzman and Marcus Armstrong. He qualified fourth at the first race in Barcelona, but fell to seventh in the first race. He made a good start in the second race to pass polesitter Niko Kari at the start. Despite a safety car, he eventually took his inaugural victory. Daruvala qualified on the front row in Paul Ricard, alongside Jake Hughes. He made a slow start, but later passed Hughes later in the race to take his second successive win. This would prove to be his last win of the season. Daruvala pressed hard in the second race to take a third place, his third podium in four races. Daruvala qualified fourth at the Red Bull Ring, he remained and finished in that position in Race one, having nearly taken third place from teammate Armstrong on the last lap. In the second race, Daruvala sat in fourth place heading into the final lap, but ahead his two Prema teammates collided which saw Daruvala promoted to second place at the flag.

Daruvala maintained his qualifying form in Silverstone, doing so in third. On the first lap in the first race, Daruvala made up a position on Christian Lundgaard. Mid-race, he aggressively defended from Armstrong but held on and would finish in second place. In the second race, Daruvala and Pedro Piquet duelled for fourth place until Daruvala hit and spun Piquet out. Piquet retired on the spot, while Daruvala came to a halt at the first corner just a few moments later. Daruvala had his worst qualifying of the year in Hungary, qualifying in 17th place. Daruvala progressed up to tenth in the first race, but on the final lap was passed by Logan Sargeant, therefore scoring no points. It was the first weekend for Daruvala to not score any podiums. Daruvala regrouped for the Spa-Francorchamps round, achieving his maiden pole position. His hopes of a third win were shattered, when midway through the first lap, Piquet who had started second, passed him for the lead. Daruvala was unable to pass Piquet, and eventually was passed by teammate Shwartzman. Daruvala ended the race in third. In the second race, Daruvala pushed to finish in fifth.

In Monza, Daruvala qualified fourth. However, he was penalized five places for each race due to driving unnecessarily slowly, which saw him demoted down to tenth. But he made a strong fightback, finishing third behind both his teammates. In the second race, Daruvala dropped off the points positions at the start, and was unable to recover, eventually finishing in 13th place. At the Sochi season finale, Daruvala qualified in second, but made a terrible start, being passed by Armstrong, Niko Kari and Leonardo Pulcini. He lost another place to Jüri Vips and eventually finished sixth. He was promoted back to fifth after Vips was penalized. Daruvala was set to start in fourth for the second race, but stalled during the formation lap. He battled his way through the field to end the race in 14th. Overall Daruvala scored seven podiums, including two wins, two fastest laps and one pole position. Daruvala was set to compete in the 2019 Macau Grand Prix, but was forced to pull out due to an injury, he was replaced by the 2019 Formula Regional European champion Frederik Vesti.

FIA Formula 2 Championship

2020 
In February 2020, Daruvala reunited with Carlin to contest the 2020 season alongside Red Bull Junior Team member Yuki Tsunoda. Additionally, he was also named as a Red Bull Junior. At the same time, he was aiming for a Formula One seat in 2021.

Daruvala finally made his debut at the Red Bull Ring round following a delayed start to the season. He qualified sixth on his debut weekend. Daruvala's hope of points were over following a poor start, before being tipped into a spin by Tsunoda. Daruvala was unable to recover and finished in 13th. He finished 16th in the sprint race, his highlight of the race being punting Luca Ghiotto out of the race. Daruvala qualified seventh for the 2nd Red Bull Ring round. However, he had slow pace compared to the others and slowly dropped out of the points to finish 12th. In the sprint race, Daruvala advanced up to ninth but in the end just missed out on points, finishing just five tenths behind Nikita Mazepin.

Daruvala qualified 16th at the Hungaroring. For the feature race, he would attempt the alternate strategy by starting on the hard tyres. It would prove to be massively successful for Daruvala, as he made many overtakes to finish sixth, scoring his first Formula 2 points. Daruvala had an atrocious start in the sprint race, falling to ninth by the first lap. But he was able to recover and finish sixth once again. Daruvala kept his top 10 qualifying streak, ranking seventh in Silverstone. He had another poor start, falling to tenth in the first few laps. He pitted early and was back up in seventh, but when drivers behind on fresher tyres passed him, Daruvala dropped to tenth at the flag. He fell to 12th at the start, but made an opportunity to pit under the safety car. He made passes to end the race in fifth, after Guanyu Zhou spun on the last lap. Daruvala qualified in a poor 16th at the second Silverstone weekend. His weekend was uneventful, finishing 12th in the feature race and just missing points in 9th in the sprint race. Daruvala had another uneventful and poor weekend in Spain, qualifying 12th and finishing both races in 17th.

Daruvala qualified ninth in Spa-Francorchamps. His weekend would turn out to be frustrating, suffering contact at the start and suffering damage to his front wing and tyre. After pitting for repairs, Daruvala had a lonely race to finish 19th, a minute and a half behind the leader. He finished 16th in the sprint race, which was his third non-scoring weekend. Daruvala qualified eighth in Monza. He went on the alternate strategy during the feature race and was down in 12th after his pit stop. A last lap pass on Marcus Armstrong saw him take 10th place and one point to end his non-scoring run. Daruvala benefitted from many retirements to finish seventh in the sprint race, before being promoted to sixth. Daruvala qualified sixth in Mugello. Once again, he had another poor start, dropping to 12th. He finished the race in 11th, but was elevated to tenth after Tsunoda was penalized. Daruvala finished the sprint race in sixth, benefitted from a collision by the Hitech Grand Prix drivers.

Daruvala qualified a season best second in Sochi qualifying, forming a Carlin front-row lockout alongside Tsunoda. He dropped to third at the start after being overtaken by Mick Schumacher. Daruvala was then undercut by Callum Ilott and Luca Ghiotto to end the race in fifth. Starting fourth in the sprint race, Daruvala dropped to fifth before receiving a five-second time penalty for corner cutting while battling Jack Aitken. With the race red-flagged, Daruvala was re-classified 11th. From eighth in Bahrain, Daruvala had a good start, making up two places in the feature race start. He soon faded down to tenth, and pitted early. As a result, Daruvala made an undercut on many drivers and was up to third. He defended hard from Schumacher in the late stages of the race to come through for his maiden Formula 2 podium. Daruvala was up in third during the sprint race opening lap. It was not to last however, he was soon passed by Mazepin before being hit by Ilott behind, ending Daruvala's race. Daruvala qualified third for the second Bahrain round, but dropped to sixth during the feature race start. He eventually finished seventh. Lining up second for the sprint race, Daruvala was passed by Schumacher on lap 4 but re-passed him back four laps later. He then hunted down Dan Ticktum and overtook him. He then took his first Formula 2 victory ahead of Tsunoda. Followed the win, Daruvala stated that he was "really excited for the future". Daruvala finished the championship with 72 points, in 12th place, far behind teammate Tsunoda in third who graduated to Formula One.

2021 

Before Daruvala's main campaign, he took part in the 2021 F3 Asian Championship with Mumbai Falcons. Overall, he claimed three victories and eight podiums. This saw him rank third in the championship, behind Pierre-Louis Chovet and champion Guanyu Zhou.

Daruvala continued in the 2021 season with Carlin alongside Dan Ticktum.  He finished in second place in the first sprint race at Bahrain, after passing David Beckmann and a retirement for Théo Pourchaire. He pressured race leader Liam Lawson in the end but was unable to pass him. Daruvala followed it up with fourth place after a slow start in the second sprint race and sixth in the feature race. In Monaco, during the first sprint race, Daruvala ran in tenth place after Christian Lundgaard had retired. However, at the penultimate corner on the final lap, Daruvala was divebombed by Marcus Armstrong and so, lost reverse pole from him. During the second sprint, Daruvala was once again passed on the last lap, this time by Lirim Zendeli for eighth. Fortunately, race winner Lawson was disqualified and Daruvala was promoted to 8th, scoring a point. He rounded out his difficult weekend with a retirement, after making contact with Gianluca Petecof after pitting.

Daruvala qualified ninth and started in second in the first sprint at Baku. However, he was unable to pressure race leader Robert Shwartzman and faded to fourth after being overtaken by Guanyu Zhou and Ticktum. Daruvala managed to escape the start chaos in the second sprint to move into 4th. Following a safety car restart, he managed to get the better of Bent Viscaal and pass him into the first corner for third place. He would remain in that position for the remainder of the race.  During the feature race, Daruvala was up in fifth at the end of lap 1, but fell to 7th at the flag.  Daruvala qualified a lowly 12th in Silverstone and finished in the same position in sprint race 1. During the second sprint, Daruvala attempted to pass Viscaal into Stowe, but instead made contact and took him out whilst damaging his front wing. Daruvala was soon given a 10-second time penalty for the incident and finished in 19th. The feature race was slightly brighter for him, as he finished tenth, just two tenths behind Zendeli but scoring a fastest lap. Just like Monaco, his weekend was difficult, scoring only 3 points.

Daruvala qualified in 2nd place at Monza, only missing out to Oscar Piastri. Daruvala would start in ninth for sprint race 1, which was where he finished, after pitting midway through the race. Having started in second for the second sprint, Daruvala took the lead from David Beckmann into the first corner. He would control the race from start to finish, and eventually took his first win of the year by six seconds. Daruvala felt that his win was "overdue" due to him being "quick in the races, not so much in qualifying". Daruvala experienced a poor start in the feature race, sinking to fourth as Zhou and Lawson both passed him. After his pit-stops, Daruvala passed Zhou off track and was forced to give it back. But a few laps later, Daruvala was passed by Pourchaire and also later by a resurgent Ticktum. Daruvala eventually finished in fifth. In Sochi, he qualified in second place. Daruvala pushed his way up into fifth in the sprint race. His efforts would be undone however, as he spun and dropped to 12th. In the feature race, a difficult start by Daruvala saw him drop to 4th after being passed by Pourchaire and Ralph Boschung. He remained behind Boschung until lap 22, when Boschung locked up and slid wide, allowing Daruvala to move up into 3rd place and score another podium.

At Jeddah, Daruvala qualified tenth. He made a move into the final corner during the first sprint, overtaking both Lundgaard and Piastri, eventually finishing in fifth. However, Daruvala was given a five-second time penalty for overtaking Ticktum off-track and gaining an advantage. He was demoted to 10th, but was given reverse pole for the second sprint. Following a safety car restart, Daruvala locked up and went off-track, gaining an advantage on second-placed Piastri. He was given a five-second time penalty for doing so. For the later part of the race, Daruvala was involved in a battle with Piastri in which the Australian won on lap 17. Just a lap later, the safety car was brought out following Lawson's crash and the whole field was bunched up. With the penalty applied, Daruvala was dropped to 14th place. His point-less weekend ended in 11th place following a red-flagged feature race. Daruvala qualified in tenth for the season finale at Yas Marina, which gave him reverse pole for the first sprint race. Throughout the race, Daruvala was pressured by Felipe Drugovich but as the race neared its end, Drugovich's challenge faded, allowing Daruvala to score his second win of the 2021. Daruvala climbed to fifth in an action-packed second sprint, but was overtaken by Drugovich and Lawson towards the end. Daruvala ended the season in 11th place. Throughout his 2021 campaign, Daruvala finished seventh in the standings and was outscored by teammate Ticktum. He achieved a total of 113 points including two race victories, a fastest lap and five podiums.

2022 

In January 2022, he reunited with reigning champions Prema Powerteam for the 2022 season partnering fellow Red Bull Junior Team member and 2021 FIA Formula 3 champion Dennis Hauger. It was initially expected to be Daruvala's final year competing in Formula 2, but remained in the championship for another year.

Daruvala qualified seventh for the Bahrain season opener. He progressed to third during the sprint race start. On lap 16, Daruvala battled with 2nd-placed Ralph Boschung in which the Indian driver won out on lap 18 and hence take second place. He fell to 11th at the race start. While running ninth after the pit stops, Daruvala made contact with a rival and was forced to pit for a front wing change. He eventually finished 14th. Daruvala qualified poorly in 14th in Jeddah. Daruvala finished the sprint race in ninth, but was elevated to seventh after Boschung and Jake Hughes were penalized. Daruvala pitted early on lap 7 during the feature race, and his strategy would pay off, overtaking a few drivers to take a surprise third place.

Daruvala qualified eighth in Imola. From third, Daruvala passed Logan Sargeant to take second. He was unable to pass race leader Marcus Armstrong and had to settle for second. Daruvala went on the alternate strategy during the feature race; starting on the hards and later pitting for softs. The strategy would fail to work, as the other runners pitting during an early safety car. As the lead runner on the alternate strategy, Daruvala eventually finished ninth. He qualified fourth in Barcelona. Starting seventh in the sprint race, Daruvala improved to fifth at the start and late in the race, passed Hughes to finish fourth. In the feature race, Daruvala was on the same alternate strategy as Imola. But on just the second lap, Daruvala retired on track with an electronic failure.

Daruvala qualified eighth in Monaco. Starting third in the sprint race, he made up one place at the start after Hughes stalled. He would go on to finish in second place behind Hauger, rounding out a Prema 1-2. Daruvala's highlight of the feature race would be an overtake on Calan Williams, to finish in the position that he started. In Baku, Daruvala secured eighth in qualifying. From third, he pounced into the lead, passing the slow starting Frederik Vesti. However during after the second safety car period, Daruvala locked up and Vesti sneaked past him, leaving him to content with second place. In a chaotic feature race, Daruvala stayed away from the chaos and brought home fourth place.

Daruvala started on pole in the sprint race having qualifying tenth in Silverstone. However, like many others, he failed to make his tyres work and dropped to eighth position when the chequered flag fell. In the feature race, he once again started on the alternate strategy and it paid off, finishing four places higher in sixth place. In Austria, Daruvala ranked 11th in qualifying, and finished in the same position during the sprint race. In the feature race, Daruvala was one of the drivers to fit slicks at the start to move into second by lap 7. He was overtaken by Roberto Merhi late in the race, but the Spaniard was penalised for track limits. Daruvala eventually finished in second place and stood on the podium, but later was given a 20-second penalty due to a track-drying infringement and dropped to 12th. Were this not to happen, he would have taken his maiden win of the season as winner Richard Verschoor would eventually be disqualified.

Daruvala once again started on reverse pole by qualifying tenth in France. He led the race until after the safety car restart, where Liam Lawson soared past him for the lead. Daruvala eventually settled for second place for his seventh podium of the year. The alternative strategy in the feature race once again gave Daruvala a solid result with seventh place. However, the next three rounds would go poorly for Daruvala. Starting 12th in both races, he jumped to sixth place at the start of the sprint race. However, his tyres faded and he slipped down the order, also compounded with a 10-second penalty for contact with a rival to finish 17th. In the feature race, Daruvala drove a clean race but barely missed points in 11th.

In Spa-Francorchamps, Daruvala qualified in ninth position. He was set to start second in the sprint race, however a technical issue pre-race brought his day to a close. In the feature race, a collision saw him pit for repairs early on, and would cap off his disappointing weekend with 20th. In Zandvoort, a spin in qualifying saw Daruvala down in 17th, and the lack of overtaking opportunities in the circuit saw him finish 16th in the sprint race. In the feature race, Daruvala was passed by Théo Pourchaire for tenth on the last lap, but a penalty for David Beckmann promoted him back to the points position.

Looking to banish his poor results from previous rounds, Daruvala managed sixth in Monza qualifying. He made up two places during the start of the sprint race, and then later passed Ayumu Iwasa to take third place. In the feature race, he was caught up in an incident with Jack Doohan and Logan Sargeant on the opening lap at Turn 4, when he moved in the braking zone to defend from Doohan, unbeknownst to the fact that was Sargeant on the outside of Doohan. This resulted in contact, with Doohan and Sargeant hitting the wall, causing the both of them to retire from the race. Daruvala was given a reprimand for the incident, but no penalty. On lap 7, he pit under the safety car which was brought out by Calan Williams' accident at the Ascari chicane, and he would jump both Iwasa and Armstrong in the pit stops. When the other drivers pit later on, Daruvala inherited the lead of the race, and held on to take his first win of the year, as well as his first ever Formula 2 feature race win.

After achieving his maiden feature race win, Daruvala went into the Abu Dhabi weekend with high hopes, but he could only manage twelfth in qualifying, albeit only three and a half tenths behind pole position. On the opening lap of the sprint race, Daruvala was caught up in a major incident with Enzo Fittipaldi. Exiting Turn 2, Daruvala lost control of his car for a second and tapped the side of Fittipaldi's car, which caused the both of them to go into the barriers hard, bringing out the red flag. Both drivers were ok. Daruvala was unable to score any points in the feature race, finishing 13th. Daruvala again finished seventh in the championship, achieving one win, seven more podiums and 126 points. Following the season, he joined MP Motorsport for post-season testing.

2023 
In 2023, Daruvala switched to reigning champions' MP Motorsport for his fourth season, whilst still having Dennis Hauger as his teammate. Ahead of his fourth season, he stated that "his future lies mainly in Formula E".

Daruvala qualified 11th in the Bahrain season opener. He made an electric start, jumping to the points positions and later pressuring Théo Pourchaire but was unable to find a way past, finishing sixth. In the feature race, he pitted early but tyre degradation was a big issue for Daruvala, and dropped to 16th.

Formula One 
Daruvala was announced as member of the Red Bull Junior Team, prior to driving in the 2020 Formula 2 Championship.

On the weekend after the 2022 Canadian Grand Prix, Daruvala was announced to have his first taste of a Formula One car with McLaren, testing the McLaren MCL35M at the Silverstone Circuit. He also had another test at the Algarve International Circuit, from July 18–19. A third F1 test came during the end of September, where he drove at the Circuit Paul Ricard.

At the start of 2023, it was confirmed that Daruvala had been released from the Red Bull Junior Team roster after three years.

Formula E 
At the end of November 2022, Daruvala was announced as a test and reserve driver for Mahindra Racing in Formula E for the 2022-23 Formula E season.

Karting record

Karting career summary

Racing record

Racing career summary 

† As Daruvala was a guest driver, he was ineligible for points.
* Season still in progress.

Complete Formula Renault 2.0 Northern European Cup results 
(key) (Races in bold indicate pole position) (Races in italics indicate fastest lap)

Complete Formula Renault 2.0 Alps results 
(key) (Races in bold indicate pole position) (Races in italics indicate fastest lap)

† As Daruvala was a guest driver, he was ineligible for points.

Complete Eurocup Formula Renault 2.0 results 
(key) (Races in bold indicate pole position) (Races in italics indicate fastest lap)

† As Daruvala was a guest driver, he was ineligible for points.

Complete Toyota Racing Series results 
(key) (Races in bold indicate pole position) (Races in italics indicate fastest lap)

Complete FIA Formula 3 European Championship results 
(key) (Races in bold indicate pole position) (Races in italics indicate fastest lap)

† Driver did not finish the race, but was classified as he completed over 90% of the race distance.
‡ Half points awarded as less than 75% of race distance was completed.

Complete Macau Grand Prix results

Complete GP3 Series results
(key) (Races in bold indicate pole position) (Races in italics indicate fastest lap)

Complete FIA Formula 3 Championship results 
(key) (Races in bold indicate pole position; races in italics indicate points for the fastest lap of top ten finishers)

† Driver did not finish the race, but was classified as he completed over 90% of the race distance.

Complete FIA Formula 2 Championship results 
(key) (Races in bold indicate pole position) (Races in italics indicate points for the fastest lap of top ten finishers)

Complete F3 Asian Championship results 
(key) (Races in bold indicate pole position) (Races in italics indicate fastest lap)

References

External links
 

1998 births
Living people
Indian racing drivers
Parsi people
Toyota Racing Series drivers
Formula Renault Eurocup drivers
Formula Renault 2.0 Alps drivers
Formula Renault 2.0 NEC drivers
FIA Formula 3 European Championship drivers
Sportspeople from Mumbai
Parsi people from Mumbai
FIA Formula 3 Championship drivers
FIA Formula 2 Championship drivers
F3 Asian Championship drivers
Indian GP3 Series drivers
Fortec Motorsport drivers
M2 Competition drivers
Josef Kaufmann Racing drivers
Carlin racing drivers
MP Motorsport drivers
Prema Powerteam drivers
Karting World Championship drivers
Mumbai Falcons drivers